The 2004 EBSA European Under-19 Snooker Championship was an amateur snooker tournament that took place from 5 April to 8 April 2004 in Wellingborough, England. It was the 8th edition of the EBSA European Under-19 Snooker Championships. The tournament was won by Welshman Jamie Jones who defeated Mark Allen 6–3 in the final.

Results

References

2004 in snooker
Snooker amateur tournaments
Wellingborough
2004 in English sport
International sports competitions hosted by England
April 2004 sports events in the United Kingdom